ʻAbd al-Wāḥid (ALA-LC romanization of ) is a male Muslim given name, and in modern usage, surname. It is built from the Arabic words ʻabd and al-Wāḥid, one of the names of God in the Qur'an, which give rise to the Muslim theophoric names. It means "servant of the One".

It may refer to:

Political people 

 Shaykh Abdul Wahid, 17th-century Mughal general
 Abd el-Ouahed ben Messaoud, 17th-century Moroccan ambassador
 Abdul-Wahid I, Almohad Caliph (died 1224), caliph of Morocco
 Abdulwahid AlAbduljabbar (1935 – 1970), Saudi political activist
 Abdul Waheed Kakar (born 1937), chief of Pakistan army
 Abdulwahid Bidin (1925 — 1999), associate justice of the Supreme Court of the Philippines
 Abdolvahed Mousavi Lari (born 1954), Iranian politician
 Abdul Wahid al Nur (born 1968), Sudanese rebel leader
 Abdul Wahid Baba Jan, Afghan soldier and politician
Mohd Abdul Wahid Endut (born 1957), Malaysian politician
Abdelwahid Aboud Mackaye (born 1953), Chadian insurgent leader
Abu Muhammad Abd al-Wahid ibn Abi Hafs, (d. 1221) Almohad governor of Ifriqiya
Raes Abdul Wahed, Afghan Taliban commander

Athletes 

 Abdul Wahid Durrani (1917 – 2008), Pakistani footballer
 Abdul-Wahid Aziz (1931 – 1982), Iraqi weightlifter
 Tariq Abdul-Wahad (born 1974), French basketball player
Abdel-Wahed El-Sayed (born 1977), Egyptian footballer
Abdul-Wahed Mohammed (born 1977), Libyan futsal player
Mohamed Abdel Wahed (born 1981), Egyptian footballer
Abdelouahad Abdessamad (born 1982), Moroccan footballer
Hussein Abdul-Wahed (born 1986), Iraqi footballer
Abdul Waheed (field hockey), player in Pakistan's 1960 Olympic hockey team
Abdelouahed Idrissi Chorfi (born 1969), Moroccan judoka

Others 
Abdul Waahid Bin Zaid (died 793), Iraqi Sufi saint
Abdelwahid al-Marrakushi (born 1185), Moroccan historian
Abdul Wahid Khan (died 1949), Indian classical singer
Abdel-Wahed El-Wakil (born 1943), Egyptian architect
Abdul Waheed Khan (UNESCO official) (born 1947), Indian IT expert
Abdelwahid Bouabdallah (born 1953), Algerian businessman
Abdul Wahid Pedersen (born 1954), Danish imam
Abdul Wahid (Bagram detainee) (died 2003), Afghan beaten to death in US custody
Abdul Wahid Nazari (born 1953), Afghan film director
Abdul Wahid Aresar (1949 – 2015), Sindhi writer

References

Arabic masculine given names